Esta boca es mía is an Uruguayan daytime talk show broadcast by Teledoce. It debuted on October 6, 2008, being one of the channel's longest-running current programs. It is presented by Victoria Rodríguez and airs Monday through Friday from 2:30 p.m. to 4 p.m.

Format 
In each broadcast of the show, the current issues of the country are covered, such as journalistic and political issues. It has a panel of experts, special guests and a gallery of people who attend the study and can ask questions to the guests or panelists on the topics being analyzed.

History 
The show debuted on October 6, 2008, and initially focused on topics such as infidelity, abortion, drugs, sexuality, among others.

The presentation ceremony was held on October 7 at the Hemingway Restaurant in Montevideo. The panel was formed by Silvia Novarese, Beatriz Argimón, Julio Toyos, Lilián Abracinskas, Karina Tucuna, Damián Coalla and Daniel Lucas.

On-air staff 
The panel is formed of Graziano Pascale, Verónica Amorelli, Alejandro Camino and Alfredo García.

Accolades 
Esta boca es mía has won the Iris Award for the Best General Interest Program three times (2012, 2016, 2018), Victoria Rodríguez has won the category of Best Female Presenter twice (2014, 2017) and the Golden Iris Award in 2017, while Washington Abdala won the Best Panelist award in 2016. In 2009 the show was awarded the Golden Iris Award.

References

External links 
 

Uruguayan television shows
Spanish-language television shows
2000s Uruguayan television series
Uruguayan television series
Teledoce original programming